Ihor Yukhnovskyi (also Yukhnovsky; born 1 September 1925) is a Ukrainian physicist and politician, and a member of the Presidium of Academy of Sciences of Ukraine, Hero of Ukraine.

Life before politics
Yukhnovskyi was born September 1, 1925 in Kniahynyny village, Dubno powiat, Wołyń Voivodeship (Poland). In 1944-45 participated in World War II on a side of Soviet Army. In 1951 he became the head of Theoretical Physics Department at Lviv University. In 1969 Yukhnovskyi, at that time Doctor of Physics and Mathematics led the newly organized Department of Statistical Theory of Condensed Matter. in 1980 the department was reorganized into the Lviv division of statistical physics for the Institute for Theoretical Physics, and then in 1990 into the Institute of Condensed Matter Physics of the National Academy of Sciences of Ukraine.

Political life
On March 30, 1990 Yukhnovskyi was elected with 59.07% votes (out of 6 candidates) as a member of parliament of Ukrainian SSR from an election district in the city of Lviv.  On May 15, 1990 he became the leader of the first ever opposition party in the Ukrainian SSR parliament named "Narodna Rada" (People’s Council).

During the 24 August 1991 parliamentary debate precede the Declaration of Independence of Ukraine Yukhnovskyi was the MP who first called on parliament to immediately declare Ukraine as an independent democratic state.

In the first presidential elections in Ukraine Yukhnovskyi was supported by 554,719 voters (1.74%) and took 5th place out of 6 candidates. In 1992 he was appointed as the first vice Prime Minister of Ukraine.

In the 1994 parliamentary elections Yukhnovskyi was elected to the parliament in the same electoral district as in 1990, the city of Lviv, with 60.41% of support. In the 1998 parliamentary elections he was elected as #15 in the People's Movement of Ukraine (Rukh) party list. In the 2002 parliamentary elections he was again elected as #68 now in the Our Ukraine party list.

Yukhnovsky is an author of over 400 scientific papers, five books and a textbook "Osnovy kvantovoyi mekhaniky" (Fundamentals of Quantum Mechanics). As a member of the parliament he actively participated in passing of over 100 bills. He was one of the authors of the Act of Declaration of Independence of Ukraine.

Ihor Yukhnovskyi is the head of All-Ukrainian Union of World War II veterans. He supports the reconciliation of veterans of Soviet Army and Ukrainian Insurgent Army.

In 2006, the Ukrainian President Viktor Yuschenko appointed Ihor Yukhnovskyi director of the Ukrainian Institute of National Remembrance.

Distinctions
 Order of Liberty (Ukraine, 2016)

References

External links
 

1925 births
Living people
First convocation members of the Verkhovna Rada
Second convocation members of the Verkhovna Rada
Third convocation members of the Verkhovna Rada
Fourth convocation members of the Verkhovna Rada
20th-century Ukrainian physicists
Candidates in the 1991 Ukrainian presidential election
People from Rivne Oblast
People of the Revolution on Granite
People's Movement of Ukraine politicians
Recipients of the title of Hero of Ukraine
Recipients of the Order of Prince Yaroslav the Wise, 3rd class
Recipients of the Order of Prince Yaroslav the Wise, 4th class
Soviet military personnel of World War II from Ukraine
Soviet physicists
First vice prime ministers of Ukraine